Solanum granuloso-leprosum is a species of plant in the family Solanaceae.

It is small tree  endemic to Brazil and Argentina, that likes sunny conditions in arid lands, being a pioneer tree that prepares the soil for other plants.

References

granuloso-leprosum
Endemic flora of Brazil
Flora of the Atlantic Forest
Flora of the Cerrado
Conservation dependent plants
Near threatened flora of South America
Taxonomy articles created by Polbot
Plants described in 1852